John McConnell (14 February 1881 – 16 March 1957) was a Scottish professional footballer who played in the Football League for Grimsby Town as a full back.

Career statistics

References

1881 births
1957 deaths
Footballers from East Ayrshire
Brentford F.C. players
English Football League players
Association football fullbacks
Glenbuck Cherrypickers F.C. players
Kilmarnock F.C. players
Nithsdale Wanderers F.C. players
St Cuthbert Wanderers F.C. players
Hurlford United F.C. players
Southern Football League players
Grimsby Town F.C. players
Scottish Football League players
Scotland junior international footballers
Scottish footballers